The 2015–16 High Point Panthers men's basketball team represented High Point University during the 2015–16 NCAA Division I men's basketball season. The Panthers, led by seventh year head coach Scott Cherry, played their home games at the Millis Athletic Convocation Center and were members of the Big South Conference. They finished the season 21–11, 13–5 in Big South play to win a share of the regular season championship. They defeated Longwood in the quarterfinals of the Big South tournament to advance to the semifinals where they lost to UNC Asheville. As a regular season conference champion and #1 seed in their conference tournament, they received an automatic bid to the National Invitation Tournament where they lost in the first round to South Carolina.

Previous season
The Panthers finished the 2014–15 season with a record of 23–10, 13–5 in conference and tied for first place. They lost in the quarterfinals of the Big South tournament to Gardner–Webb. They received a bid to the CIT where they lost to Eastern Kentucky in the second round.

Roster

Schedule 

|-
!colspan=12 style="background:Purple; color:White;" | Regular season

|-
!colspan=12 style="background:Purple; color:White;" | Big South tournament

|-
!colspan=12 style="background:Purple; color:White;" | NIT

References

High Point Panthers men's basketball seasons
High Point
High Point